Esmailabad (also Romanized as Esmā‘īlābād; also known as Yūqūrtchī and Yurchi) is a village in Sharabian Rural District, Mehraban District, Sarab County, East Azerbaijan Province, Iran. At the 2006 census, its population was 374, in 88 families.

References 

Populated places in Sarab County